Samuel Ramón Quiñones Quiñones (October 29, 1903 – March 11, 1976) commonly known as Samuel R. Quiñones was a prominent attorney in Puerto Rico who served as Speaker of the House of Representatives of Puerto Rico from 1941 to 1943 and for twenty years in the Senate of Puerto Rico as its fifth President, from 1949 to 1968, by far the longest serving Senate President. He is also the only person two hold both posts.

Biography
Samuel Ramón Quiñones Quiñones was born in San Juan, Puerto Rico to his parents Don Francisco Quiñones and Doña Dolores Quiñones. He studied law at the University of Puerto Rico.

During the 1930s and 1940s he served on various organizations: President of Ateneo Puertorriqueño (1934-1937), President of Colegio de Abogados (1943-1945), President of House of Representatives in Puerto Rico (1941-1943), Vice President for the Senate of Puerto Rico (1945) and elected President of PPD (Partido Popular Democrático) in 1938.  He had also served as Speaker of the House of Representatives of Puerto Rico in the early 1940s.  During his terms in office as President of the Senate, he commissioned the famed Toro & Ferrer architectural firm to design the Senate Annex office building, which was inaugurated in 1955.

Between 1951 and 1952 he served as one of the most prominent members of the Constitutional Convention of Puerto Rico that drafted the Constitution of the Commonwealth of Puerto Rico.

A prolific poet and writer, he founded the literary magazine called Índice. In 1941 he published an essay book: Temas y letras.

Quiñones died in San Juan, Puerto Rico by his mouth cancer on March 11, 1976, at the age of 71. Was buried at Santa María Magdalena de Pazzis Cemetery in San Juan, Puerto Rico.

See also

List of Puerto Ricans

References

Sources 
 "Legisladores puertorriqueños 1900-1996", by Nestor Rigual
 "Elecciones y Partidos Politicos de Puerto Rico 1809-2000", by Fernando Bayron Toro

Burials at Santa María Magdalena de Pazzis Cemetery
20th-century Puerto Rican lawyers
People from San Juan, Puerto Rico
Members of the Senate of Puerto Rico
1903 births
1976 deaths
Speakers of the House of Representatives of Puerto Rico
Puerto Rican poets
Puerto Rican male writers
20th-century American poets
Presidents of the Senate of Puerto Rico
Presidents pro tempore of the Senate of Puerto Rico
Deaths from cancer in Puerto Rico
Deaths from oral cancer
20th-century American politicians
20th-century American male writers
20th-century Puerto Rican poets